This is a list of notable women, living and dead, from Cornwall and the Isles of Scilly in the United Kingdom. Notability is based on achievements that have had a verifiable impact or public output or participation in a significant event, in the fields of art, literature, business, industry, science, culture, sport, education, politics, war, philanthropy, medicine and a range of other topics.

Notable women from Cornwall are also listed in the article List of people from Cornwall.

A 

Constance Agar-Robartes, First World War nurse
Victoria Amran, founder of the Cornish Food Box Company, business woman
Candy Atherton, ex-MP for Falmouth and Camborne

B 

Morwenna Banks, actor
Antonia Barber, writer of fiction
Frances Basset, 2nd Baroness Basset
Maria Branwell, mother of English writers Emily Brontë, Anne Brontë and Charlotte Brontë
Michaela Breeze, Commonwealth champion weightlifter
 Dame Alida Brittain, harpist
Mary Bryant, famous prisoner who escaped Australian penal colony
Katharine Burdekin, novelist, feminist, sister of Rowena Cade

C 

Rowena Cade, creator, builder and founder of the Minack Theatre
Elizabeth Carne, scientist and banker
Vera Carne, First World War Women's Land Army
Helena Charles, Cornish nationalist
Evelyn Clements, munitions worker
Ithell Colquhoun, artist and writer
Myrna Combellack, researcher and translator of Beunans Meriasek
Judith Cook, journalist and campaigner
Selina Cooper, suffragist
Margaret Ann Courtney, folklorist and poet

D 
Phyllis Doherty, folk singer, First World War commandant of Women's Volunteer Motor Corps
Anne Dowriche, poet
Daphne du Maurier, novelist and writer

F 
Liz Fenwick, writer, novelist
Elizabeth Forbes, artist and storyteller
Anna Maria Fox, a promoter of the Royal Cornwall Polytechnic Society
Caroline Fox, writer

G 

Susan Elizabeth Gay, writer
Ann Glanville, 19th-century champion rower
Helen Glover, rower, Olympic gold medallist 2012
Julia Goldsworthy, politician
Queen Gwendolin, medieval legendary figure

H 
Melissa Hardie-Budden, writer, founder of the Hypatia Trust, philanthropist
Faith Harris, sailor, secretary to Railway Purchasing Mission
Barbara Hepworth, sculptor and artist
Alice Hext, gardener and philanthropist
Corona Hicks, women's rights campaigner
Rose Hilton, artist
Emily Hobhouse, peace activist and human rights campaigner
Salome Hocking, novelist
Barbara Hosking, civil servant and broadcaster

I 
Iseult, figure in Arthurian legend

J 

Loveday Jenkin, Cornish nationalist politician; councillor for Crowan and Wendron
F. Tennyson Jesse, writer
Jane Johnson, writer

K 

Ann Kelley, writer and photographer
Marguerite Kesteloot, Belgian refugee, strawberry grower
Laura Knight, artist

L 
Mary Lang, writer, photographer, sailor, diarist
Cassandra Latham, white witch
Janet Leach, artist
Katharine Lee (Kitty Lee Jenner; 1853–1936), writer
Margaret Lidgey, bal captain, First World War mine manager
Alice de Lisle, Lord of Alverton, founder of Penzance market
Moura Lympany, musician, concert pianist

M 

Margo Maeckelberghe, artist
Jessica Mann, novelist and journalist
Charlotte Mary Matheson, writer
Margaret Mellis, St Ives school artist
Chesten Marchant, last monoglot Cornish-speaker (died 1676)
Anna Maria Murphy, writer, playwright, poet, storyteller
Sherryl Murray, MP for South East Cornwall

N 
Sarah Newton, MP for Truro and Falmouth
Thandie Newton, actor

P 
Gertrude Parsons, novelist
Cassie Patten, British Olympic swimmer
Susan Penhaligon, actor
Dolly Pentreath, last Cornish speaker according to tradition
Thomasine, Lady Percival, benefactress and founder of a school
Annie Phillips, autograph collector
Elizabeth Philp, singer, music educator and composer
Rosamunde Pilcher, novelist
Litz Pisk, movement pioneer and instructor
Beatrice Pole-Carew, First World War host for convalescent soldiers (portrait)
Margaret Steuart Pollard (Peggy), Cornish language poet
Agnes Prest, Protestant martyr

Q 
Mabel Quiller-Couch, editor, compiler and children's writer

R 
Joan Rendell, historian
Jean Rhys, writer
Mary Richards (prisoner of war), First World War prisoner of war in Germany
Edith Jane Rouncefield, First World War nurse in First Aid Nursing Yeomanry and co-founder of Mevagissey Museum
Jenny Rowe, lawyer and civil servant
Hilda Runciman, MP for St Ives
Mary Snell Rundle, nursing educator

S 

Angie Sage, writer, novelist
Sweet Saraya, professional wrestler
Kristin Scott Thomas, actor
Penelope Shuttle, poet
Jemma Simpson, 800m runner
Emma Smith, writer
Hannah Stacey, free-diver
Emily Stackhouse, scientist

T 
Mary Ann Tocker, early radical who exposed corruption in the Stannary Courts, 1818
Sheila Tracy, writer, broadcaster, musician, trombonist, singer
Enys Tregarthen, children's writer
Sharon Tregenza, writer, novelist
Kate Tremayne, writer, novelist

V 
Annabel Vernon, champion rower (2008 Olympics)
 Clara Coltman Vyvyan, née Rogers, an author and the wife of the 10th Vyvyan baronet

W 
Serena Wadham, feminist activist and photographer
Mary Wesley, writer, novelist
Mary Williams (nurse), First World War Voluntary Aid Detachment hospital organiser
Venetia Williams, racehorse trainer
Mary Wolverston aka Lady Killigrew, alleged pirate
Brenda Wootton, Cornish poet and singer
Lilian Wyles, First female police detective in Scotland Yard

References 

Cornwall-related biographical lists
 Wom
People from the Isles of Scilly
Women
Lists of women